Crematogastrini is a tribe of myrmicine ants with 64 genera and 8 fossil genera.

Genera

References

Myrmicinae
Ant tribes